Moniruzzaman Monir is a Bangladeshi music composer. He won Bangladesh National Film Award for Best Lyrics three times in 1988, 1989 and 1990. He was awarded Ekushey Padak in 2004 by the Government of Bangladesh. He has written songs for 196 films.

Personal life
Monir is married to Fatema Monir.

Discography

Filmography

Awards
 Ekushey Padak (2004)
 Bangladesh National Film Award for Best Lyrics (1990)
 Bangladesh National Film Award for Best Lyrics (1989)
 Bangladesh National Film Award for Best Lyrics (1988)

References

Living people
1952 births
Bangladeshi composers
Recipients of the Ekushey Padak in arts
Best Lyricist National Film Award (Bangladesh) winners